The 79th Golden Globe Awards honored the best in film and American television of 2021, as chosen by the Hollywood Foreign Press Association (HFPA). The ceremony took place privately on January 9, 2022. The nominees were announced on December 13, 2021, by rapper Snoop Dogg and HFPA president Helen Hoehne.

For the first time since 2008, there was no traditional, televised ceremony. In support of boycotts of the HFPA by various media companies, actors, and other creatives over its lack of action to increase the membership diversity of the organization, the Golden Globes' regular broadcaster NBC declined to televise the 79th Golden Globe Awards. The HFPA ultimately chose to hold the presentation privately, with attendance limited to the organization's beneficiaries, and results announced via press release and highlighted on the Golden Globe Awards' social media pages.

The films Belfast and The Power of the Dog were tied for the most nominations, at seven each. The latter tied with Steven Spielberg's West Side Story and HBO's drama Succession with the most awards of the night, with three each. These included the awards for Best Drama Film, Best Musical or Comedy Film and Best Drama Series, respectively. Michaela Jaé Rodriguez made history as the first transgender person to win an acting award at the Golden Globes, winning Best Actress – Television Series Drama for her role as Blanca Rodriguez-Evangelista in Pose. Rachel Zegler also made history as the first actress of Colombian descent and first Latina to win Best Actress – Motion Picture Comedy or Musical for her performance as María Vasquez in West Side Story, as well as becoming the youngest winner in that category at 20 years old. Zegler also made history as one of the first people born in the 21st century to win a Golden Globe, alongside Billie Eilish (20 years old) who won Best Original Song for "No Time to Die", theme song to the film of the same name. For his performance as Oh Il-nam in Netflix's Squid Game, O Yeong-su became the first South Korean actor to win an acting award, winning for Best Supporting Actor – Series, Miniseries or Television Film.

Ceremony information

On May 10, 2021, NBC announced that it would not televise the ceremony, in support of a boycott of the HFPA by multiple media companies over what it criticized as insufficient efforts to increase the membership diversity of the organization. NBC added that it would be open to televising the ceremony in 2023 if the HFPA were successful in its efforts to reform its organization. Following these events, the HFPA released a timeline for its reforms, which would see the process completed by the week of August 2, 2021. On October 1, 2021, the HFPA released a list of 21 new members that it had recruited under these reforms.

The HFPA then announced on October 15 that it still planned to hold the 79th Golden Globe Awards on January 9, 2022, with or without a telecast. It was then reported that the HFPA would not require its normal submission process and screening requirements for the year. NBC ultimately aired Sunday Night Football as usual on the night of the ceremony, with the 2021 NFL season having extended the regular season to 17 game, 18-week season for the first time.

Details of the ceremony remained unclear when the HFPA announced the nominations on December 13, including whether the nominees would continue to boycott the ceremony. Following the announcement of nominations, The New York Times wrote that the HFPA's choices represented improvement on its goal to diversify itself, but it along with many other publications doubted its effectiveness. In support of the boycott, many studios chose not to acknowledge Golden Globes nominations in their "For Your Consideration" marketing.

On January 6, the HFPA announced that the ceremony would be held privately, with the winners announced via its social media platforms and press releases. It marked the first time since the 36th Golden Globe Awards in 1979 that there was no telecast, and the 65th Golden Globe Awards in 2008 that there was no traditional ceremony. The HFPA stated that the 90-minute event would primarily highlight the organization's philanthropic efforts, and be interspersed with the award presentations. After reportedly being unable to secure celebrities to serve as presenters, attendance was limited to those associated with the HFPA's beneficiaries, and no nominees, guests, or credentialed media were in attendance. The ceremony was held under strict COVID-19 protocol due to the Omicron variant's widespread surge in Los Angeles.

Winners and nominees

Film

Films with multiple nominations
The following films received multiple nominations:

Films with multiple wins
The following films received multiple wins:

Television

Series with multiple nominations
The following television series received multiple nominations:

Series with multiple wins
The following series received multiple wins:

References

External links
 
 2022 Golden Globes Nominations at YouTube

Boycotts of organizations
Golden Globe
Golden Globe
079
January 2022 events in the United States